Another Opus is an album by vibraphonist Lem Winchester which was recorded in 1960 and released on the New Jazz label.

Reception

Allmusic reviewer Scott Yanow described it as "one of Lem Winchester's definitive sets".

Track listing 
All compositions by Lem Winchester except where noted.
 "Another Opus" – 6:31
 "Blues Prayer" – 10:37
 "The Meetin'" (Oliver Nelson) – 5:48
 "Like Someone in Love" ( Jimmy Van Heusen, Johnny Burke) – 6:30
 "Both Barrels" – 4:56

Personnel 
Lem Winchester – vibraphone
Frank Wess – tenor saxophone, flute
Hank Jones – piano
Eddie Jones – bass
Gus Johnson – drums

References 

Lem Winchester albums
1960 albums
New Jazz Records albums
Albums recorded at Van Gelder Studio
Albums produced by Esmond Edwards